This is a list of defunct airlines of Malta.

See also

 List of airlines of Malta
 List of airports in Malta

References

Malta
Airlines
Airlines, defunct
Airlines